In enzymology, a galactose-6-phosphate isomerase is an enzyme that catalyzes the chemical reaction

D-galactose 6-phosphate  D-tagatose 6-phosphate

Hence, this enzyme has one substrate, D-galactose 6-phosphate, and one product, D-tagatose 6-phosphate.

This enzyme belongs to the family of isomerases, specifically those intramolecular oxidoreductases interconverting aldoses and ketoses.  The systematic name of this enzyme class is D-galactose-6-phosphate aldose-ketose-isomerase. This enzyme participates in galactose metabolism.

References

 
 

EC 5.3.1
Enzymes of unknown structure